The Philippine Senate Committee on Urban Planning, Housing and Resettlement is a standing committee of the Senate of the Philippines.

Jurisdiction 
According to the Rules of the Senate, the committee handles all matters relating to urban land reform, planning, housing, resettlement and urban community development.

Members 
Based on the Rules of the Senate, the Senate Committee on Urban Planning, Housing and Resettlement has 11 members.

The President Pro Tempore, the Majority Floor Leader, and the Minority Floor Leader are ex officio members.

Here are the members of the committee in the 18th Congress as of September 24, 2020:

Committee secretary: Rachel L. Yuayan

References

External links 
Bria Homes Website

Urban
Housing in the Philippines